Fyodor Ivanovich Iordan, or Jordan (Russian: Фёдор Иванович Иордан; 13 August 1800  - 19 September 1883) was a Russian engraver and art professor. He was best known for portraits and reproductions of the Old Masters.

Biography 
His father was the upholsterer for the Imperial Court. He was enrolled in the primary school courses at the Imperial Academy of Arts and, in 1819, entered the engraving class, serving as an apprentice of Nikolai Utkin. He graduated in 1824 and received a gold medal for his engraving, "Mercury lulls Argus", after a painting by Pyotr Sokolov. Shortly after, he was awarded another gold medal at one of the Academy's exhibitions for his rendering of the "Dying Abel", after a work by Anton Losenko.
 
In 1829, he went to Paris, where he studied with Théodore Richomme. When the July Revolution began, he moved to London, continuing his studies with Abraham Raimbach and John Henry Robinson. In 1834, he settled in Rome where, at the urging of Karl Briullov, he produced a huge engraving of the "Transfiguration" by Raphael, which took him twelve (some sources say fifteen) years to complete. As a result of this work, he became an honorary member of the Academy of Arts, Berlin and the Accademia delle Arti del Disegno in Florence. He was named an Academician by the Imperial Academy in 1844 and was awarded the title of Professor in 1850, when he returned to Saint Petersburg.

After the death of Stepan Galaktionov in 1854, he became head of the engraving department at the Academy and was appointed an assistant curator for prints and drawings at the Hermitage. The following year, he married Varvara Pushchin (1833-1916), a close relative of the poet, Pyotr Pletnyov. In 1861, he gave private engraving lessons to Taras Shevchenko. He was promoted to head curator of prints after the death of Nikolai Utkin in 1863. Eight years later, he became a Rector in the painting and sculpture departments (the only time this position has been held by an engraver) and, in 1876, was named a superintendent in the mosaic division. Towards the end of his life, he was appointed Privy Councilor.

Selected portraits

References

Further reading 
 Nikolai Belyaev (compiler), Записки ректора и профессора Академии художеств Федора Ивановича Иордана (Notes of a Rector and Professor at the Academy of Arts), Библиотека Российской Академии Наук, 2012 
 Biography and appreciation from the Russian Biographical Dictionary @ Russian WikiSource.

External links

1800 births
1883 deaths
Russian engravers
People from Pavlovsk, Saint Petersburg
Russian art directors
Curators from Saint Petersburg